"Get It Together" is a song written by Hal Davis, Don Fletcher, Berry Gordy, Mel Larson and Jerry Marcellino. Sung by The Jackson 5 in 1973, it is the title track from their album, Get It Together.

Personnel
Lead vocals — Michael Jackson and Jermaine Jackson
Background vocals — Michael Jackson, Jermaine Jackson, Tito Jackson, Jackie Jackson and Marlon Jackson
Instrumentation by assorted Los Angeles musicians

Charts
"Get It Together" peaked at No. 28 on the Billboard Hot 100.

Television appearances
The group made several appearances to promote their new sound. They appeared on The Bob Hope Special (September 26, 1973), Soul Train (November 3, 1973), the TV special One More Time (January 10, 1974), and on their own variety show The Jacksons (1977).

References

External links
http://www.jackson5abc.com/singles/ 

1973 singles
1973 songs
The Jackson 5 songs
Songs written by Hal Davis
Songs written by Berry Gordy
Song recordings produced by Norman Whitfield
Motown singles